Mohamad Fakih  is a Lebanese-Canadian businessperson, and philanthropist. Founder of the Middle Eastern Halal restaurant chain, Paramount Fine Foods, Fakih also conducts charitable work and community service through the Fakih Foundation.

Background

Mohamad Fakih was born to Abdallah and Nabiha in Beirut, Lebanon. In 1997, Fakih opened a jewelry store in Lebanon, working as a gemologist. He emigrated to Canada in 1999. He is married with three sons and lives in Mississauga, Ontario, Canada. 

Mohamad Fakih claims to have purchased a nearly bankrupt shawarma restaurant in Mississauga in 2006. That purchase turned into a successful restaurant franchise over the following decade. However, in 2022 it was revealed through a series of court documents that Mohamad Fakih was embroiled in an intense court battle to retain control of his franchise. The Financial Post reported that AHM Investments Corp which owns 75% of Paramount Fine Foods, have filed a motion at the Ontario Superior Court to have Fakih removed as Director. AHM Investments Corp alleged that Mohamad Fakih and his company, Fakih Group, owe nearly $12 million to the business. In addition, the shareholders also allege in court documents, that millions of dollars are owed to the CRA for unremitted HST. A Toronto-based forensic accounting firm, Farber & Partners, conducted an audit of Paramount Fine Foods and found irregularities in expenditures by Mohamad Fakih, which included lease payments toward a Range Rover driven by Fakih's wife, and a $10,000 monthly payment toward a 2022 Mercedes Maybach S580 while the business struggles to stay afloat. Mohamad Fakih is a known philanthropist and touts his success to being generous and was given the Order of Canada in 2022. However, contrary to Mohamad Fakih's claim of success, the Farber report reveals that his company has not turned a profit since 2015. Mohamad Fakih lashed out at the allegations, called the report "one-sided", and claims that his investors are "throwing dirt" at him knowing his reputation is important to him.

Career

Paramount Fine Foods

Fakih founded Paramount in 2006 with the purchase of a nearly-bankrupt shawarma shop. 

The company operates family style restaurants with entertainment for kids, while serving family-style Middle Eastern dishes. The company operates on a franchise model and is headquartered in Mississauga, Canada. Paramount sold 75% of its shares to a Kuwaiti based investment firm AHM Investments in 2015, and Mohamad Fakih owns 25% equity in the business. As of 2018 there were multiple Paramount locations across North America. Mohammad Fakih led an unsuccessful expansion of Paramount Fine Foods in the United States in 2016 facing several store closures by 2017, which included the flagship Orlando location of Paramount Fine Foods, and Paramount Lebanese Kitchen which closed its doors to the public the same year in Tampa, Florida.  

Paramount also operates fine middle eastern dining restaurants and halal butcher shops. 

In 2018, the company purchased the naming rights to Hershey Centre, a sports arena in Mississauga, renaming it the Paramount Fine Foods Centre. 

On May 30, 2021, Fakih's Paramount restaurant located in Mississauga suffered severe structural damage following a 3-alarm fire. Fakih remained firm in saying that he would rebuild what had been lost. 

In 2022, The Globe and Mail reported of a legal battle between Mohamad Fakih and majority owners of Paramount Fine Foods, AHM Investments, at the Ontario Superior Court. The article cites a series of allegations against Mohamad Fakih by his investors, which include personal expenses for car leases paid for by the business and owed payments in excess of millions of dollars to the CRA.

Awards and honours 

Key to the City of Mississauga:  In November 2019, Fakih was given the Key to the City of Mississauga by Mayor Bonnie Crombie. He is the third person to receive this honour from the City. 

Most Admired CEO in Canada: On November 27, 2019, Mohamad Fakih was named the most admired CEO in Canada (mid market) by Waterstone Human Capital’s Most Admired awards, one of the highest accolades a Canadian business leader can receive.

Doctorate of Laws: In the fall of 2018 Fakih was awarded an honorary doctorate from Ryerson University for his contributions to Canadian society.

Renaming of Hershey Centre to Paramount Centre: In 2018, the former Hershey Centre in Mississauga, a 5400 capacity sports arena, was renamed the Paramount Centre after the company purchased the naming rights. 

Top 25 Canadian Immigrant Award: In 2017, Fakih was one of the recipients of the Top 25 Canadian Immigrant Awards, presented by Canadian Immigrant magazine.

Philanthropy and community service 

Mosque Rebuild and Funerals: After a gunman targeted Muslims at prayer in Quebec, killing six, Fakih paid for funeral expenses for the victims and repairs to the mosque. 

Homeless Aid: During a stretch of -30 degree weather in December 2017, when Toronto’s housing shelters were at capacity, Fakih helped pay for dozens of hotel rooms for the homeless and years later, continues to financially support ongoing efforts to get families off the streets.

Defamation suit 

In 2017, a series of racist attacks were directed at Mohamad Fakih in the form of public harassment, online videos, and other interviews attacking his religion and his character. One incident occurred in front of Fakih's children. In 2019, an Ontario court awarded Fakih CAD $2.5 million in damages, one of the largest defamation judgments in Canadian history.

References

1971 births
Living people
Businesspeople from Ontario
Lebanese emigrants to Canada
Members of the Order of Canada
People from Mississauga